Amoskeag may refer to:

Amoskeag Falls, a waterfall on the Merrimack River in Manchester, New Hampshire, USA
Amoskeag Manufacturing Company, a former textile manufacturing company
Amoskeag Company, a company spun off from the Amoskeag Manufacturing Company
Amoskeag Locomotive Works, a former locomotive manufacturing company
Amoskeag Rugby Club, a rugby team in Manchester, NH